Kate Cayley is a Canadian writer and theatre director. She was the artistic director of Stranger Theatre and was playwright-in-residence at Toronto's Tarragon Theatre from 2009 to 2017.

As a playwright, her plays have included The Yellow Wallpaper Project, The Hanging of Françoise Laurent, Clown of God, And What Alice Found There, The Counterfeit Marquise, After Akhmatova and The Bakelite Masterpiece.

She won the Geoffrey Bilson Award in 2012 for her young adult novel The Hangman in the Mirror, and the Trillium Book Award in 2015 for her short story collection How You Were Born. She was also shortlisted for a ReLit Award in 2014 for her poetry collection How This World Comes to an End, and for the Governor General's Award for English-language fiction at the 2015 Governor General's Awards for How You Were Born.

Works

Plays
The Yellow Wallpaper Project (created from "The Yellow Wallpaper" by Charlotte Perkins Gilman)
The Clown of God
East of the Sun, West of the Moon (based on East of the Sun and West of the Moon)
The Counterfeit Marquise (adapted from "The Counterfeit Marquise" by Charles Perrault)
And What Alice Found There (based on Alice's Adventures in Wonderland, Through the Looking-Glass, and other writings from Lewis Carroll)
The World Turned Upside Down (adapted from Gerrard Winstanley and Christopher Hill (historian))
The Hanging of Françoise Laurent (based on "Marrying the Hangman" by Margaret Atwood)
The Bakelite Masterpiece
After Akhmatova
This is Nowhere
The Archive of Missing Things

Poetry
Other Houses (Brick Books 2017; OCLC )
When This World Comes to an End (Brick Books 2013; OCLC )

Short Stories
Householders (Biblioasis 2021; OCLC )
How You Were Born (Pedlar Press 2014; OCLC )

Young Adult Fiction
The Hangman in the Mirror (Annick Press 2011; OCLC )

References

21st-century Canadian novelists
21st-century Canadian poets
21st-century Canadian dramatists and playwrights
21st-century Canadian short story writers
Canadian women novelists
Canadian women poets
Canadian women dramatists and playwrights
Canadian women short story writers
Canadian writers of young adult literature
Canadian theatre directors
Canadian lesbian writers
Writers from Ottawa
Living people
21st-century Canadian women writers
Women writers of young adult literature
Year of birth missing (living people)
21st-century Canadian LGBT people